Capital Region Water (formerly known as Harrisburg Authority) is a municipal authority providing drinking water, wastewater and stormwater services in Dauphin County, Pennsylvania.

See also
List of municipal authorities in Dauphin County, Pennsylvania

References

Municipal authorities in Pennsylvania
Government of Harrisburg, Pennsylvania